Bran and Sceólang ("raven" and "survivor” ) are the hounds of Fionn mac Cumhaill in the Fenian Cycle of Irish mythology.

The dogs are described as being mostly white, with purple haunches, a crimson tail, blue feet, and standing as tall as Fionn's shoulder. Bran is male, while Sceólang is female. Bran is also sometimes described as a merle. The hounds' mother, Uirne, was transformed into a dog while pregnant, hence the canine birth of her twin children. While Uirne is returned to full humanity after giving birth to her pups, Bran and Sceólang remain hounds throughout the duration of their mythos. As Uirne is the sister of Fionn's mother Muirne, Bran and Sceólang would be their masters' cousins.

The dogs appear throughout the Fenian Cycle. In particular, throughout Fionn's hunts, it is mentioned that Bran is always by his side, while certain later folk tales suggest that the dogs grew up alongside each other. Per legend, they were the first to discover Fionn's son Oisín wandering naked in the forest. Sceólang eventually dies in the 'Chase of Thrush Glen', after pursuing a half-black and half-white doe. (Thrush Glen is Glenasmole, in the mountains of south Co Dublin, favourite hunting place of the Fianna, and also where Fionn's son Oisín is reputed to have returned to Ireland from Tír na nÓg.) Bran, meanwhile, chooses to die by drowning after being struck by Fionn in an impulsive moment.

References 

Fenian Cycle
Mythological dogs
Irish legendary creatures